The  is a stable of sumo wrestlers in Japan, one of the Tokitsukaze group of stables. It was founded in 1769 and was dominant during the Taishō period.

In its modern form it dates from 1941 when it was established by Futabayama, who was still an active wrestler at the time. It was known as Futabayama Dojo until it was re-named Tokitsukaze stable in November 1945 when Futabayama retired. (The stable has the names of both Futabayama and Tokitsukaze at its entrance.) Upon Futabayama's death in 1968 the former Kagamisato took charge for a short time, but Futabayama's widow wanted Yutakayama Katsuo to take over, which he did upon his retirement in 1969. He in turn passed control of the stable on to his successor Futatsuryū in August 2002.  As of January 2023 it had 17 active wrestlers, one of whom is sekitori.

The death of 17-year-old junior member Tokitaizan (real name Takashi Saito) in a hazing scandal on June 26, 2007, eventually resulted in the dismissal and six years in prison for Futatsuryū. This compelled Tokitsuumi, a long time top division wrestler from the stable, to retire from active sumo and take over as the new head of the stable.

Tokitsuumi was asked by the Japan Sumo Association to retire in February 2021 after twice violating COVID-19 safety protocols. Tokitsukaze stable was taken over by former maegashira Tosayutaka.

Ring name conventions
Many wrestlers at this stable have taken ring names or shikona that begin with the character 時 (read: toki), meaning time, which is the first character in the stable's name, such as Tokitsunada, Tokibayama and Tokitenkū. However this has fallen out of favour in recent years with Tokisakae being the only active wrestler using this kanji as of 2019. A number of wrestlers have also included the character 豊 (read: yutaka) in their shikona in deference to the last ōzeki produced by the stable, Yutakayama Katsuo, and the successor to his shikona, Yutakayama Hiromitsu. Examples include Yutakafuji, Tosayutaka and the active wrestler Yutakayama Ryōta.

Owners
2021–Present: 17th Tokitsukaze (toshiyori, former maegashira Tosayutaka)
2007-2021: 16th Tokitsukaze (iin, former maegashira Tokitsuumi)
2002–2007: 15th Tokitsukaze (former komusubi Futatsuryū) 
1969–2002: 14th Tokitsukaze (former ōzeki Yutakayama Katsuo) 
1968–1969: 13th Tokitsukaze (the 42nd yokozuna Kagamisato)
1941–1968: 12th Tokitsukaze (shunin, the 35th yokozuna Futabayama)

Notable active wrestlers

Shōdai (best rank ōzeki)

Coaches
Edagawa Hideki (iin, former maegashira Aogiyama)
Nakagawa Kenji (toshiyori, former maegashira Asahisato)

Notable former members
Kagamisato (the 42nd yokozuna)
Kitabayama (former ōzeki)
Ōuchiyama (former ōzeki)
Yutakayama Katsuo (former ōzeki)
Kurama (former sekiwake)
Toyonoshima (former sekiwake)
Ōshio (former komusubi)
Ōyutaka (former komusubi)
Shimotori (former komusubi)
Tokitenkū (former komusubi)
Yutakayama Hiromitsu (former komusubi)
Tokitsunada (former maegashira) 
Tosayutaka (best rank maegashira)
 (former maegashira)
Yutakayama Ryōta (best rank maegashira)

Usher
Mamoru (Makushita yobidashi, real name Mamoru Nagae)

Hairdresser
Tokoyoshi (1st class tokoyama)

Location and access
Tokyo, Sumida ward, Ryōgoku 3-15-4
3 minute walk from Ryōgoku Station on the Sōbu Line

See also
List of sumo stables
List of active sumo wrestlers
List of past sumo wrestlers
Glossary of sumo terms

References

External links 
Homepage 
Facebook site 
Japan Sumo Association profile
Article on Tokitsukaze stable

Active sumo stables